Nephthys (minor planet designation: 287 Nephthys) is a large Main belt asteroid that was discovered by German-American astronomer C. H. F. Peters on August 25, 1889, in Clinton, New York and named after the goddess, Nephthys in Egyptian mythology. It is classified as an S-type asteroid.

References

External links
 
 

Background asteroids
Nephthys
Nephthys
S-type asteroids (Tholen)
18890825